Frederick Neville Sutherland Leveson-Gower (31 May 1874 – 9 April 1959), was a British Liberal Unionist Party politician from the Leveson-Gower family.

Leveson-Gower was the son of Lord Albert Leveson-Gower, third son of George Sutherland-Leveson-Gower, 2nd Duke of Sutherland. His mother was Grace Emma Townshend Abdy, daughter of Sir Thomas  Abdy, 1st Baronet. He entered Parliament for Sutherland in 1900, a seat he held until defeated by Alpheus Morton in the Liberal landslide of 1906. He was appointed a deputy lieutenant of Sutherland in 1905.

Leveson-Gower married Blanche Lucie Gillard in 1916. He died in April 1959, aged 84.

See also
Duke of Sutherland
Liberal Unionist Party
Alpheus Morton

Notes

References

External links
 

1874 births
1959 deaths
Members of the Parliament of the United Kingdom for Highland constituencies
Frederick Neville Sutherland Leveson-Gower
Liberal Unionist Party MPs for Scottish constituencies
UK MPs 1900–1906
Deputy Lieutenants of Sutherland